Seer Jagir is a census village in the Sopore tehsil of Baramulla district, Jammu & Kashmir, India. As per the 2011 Census of India, Seer Jagir has a total population of 7,997 people including 4,085 males and 3,912 with a literacy rate of 56.81%.

References 

Villages in Baramulla district